The 1985 English cricket season was the 86th in which the County Championship had been an official competition. England recovered The Ashes against an Australian team that had lost several players to a "rebel tour" of South Africa. The Britannic Assurance County Championship was won by Middlesex.

Honors
County Championship - Middlesex
NatWest Trophy - Essex
Sunday League - Essex
Benson & Hedges Cup - Leicestershire
Minor Counties Championship - Cheshire
MCCA Knockout Trophy - Durham
Second XI Championship - Nottinghamshire II 
Wisden - Phil Bainbridge, Richard Ellison, Craig McDermott, Neal Radford, Tim Robinson

Test series

England won the Ashes thanks to the batting of Mike Gatting, Tim Robinson and David Gower; and some excellent seam bowling by Richard Ellison. As in 1981, this was another disappointing Australian team, but their recovery was complete by the time of their next visit in 1989.

Zimbabwe tour
Zimbabwe made their second tour of England and played in 8 first-class matches, mostly against county opposition.

County Championship

NatWest Trophy

Benson & Hedges Cup

Sunday League

Leading batsmen
Viv Richards of Somerset topped the batting averages with 1836 runs at an average of 76.50.

The leading run scorer was Essex and England batsman Graham Gooch with 2208 runs at 71.22 from 33 innings.

Leading bowlers
Richard Ellison of Kent  and England topped the bowling averages, taking 65 wickets at an average of 17.20.

Worcestershire bowler Neal Radford was the leading wicket taker with 101, at an average of 24.68.

References

External sources
 CricketArchive – season and tournament itineraries

Annual reviews
 Playfair Cricket Annual 1986
 Wisden Cricketers' Almanack 1986

English cricket seasons in the 20th century
English Cricket Season, 1985
Cricket season